The Hundred of Balaklava is a cadastral unit of hundred located on the northern Adelaide Plains in South Australia immediately south of the Wakefield River. It is one of the eight hundreds of the County of Gawler. It was named in 1856 by Governor Dominick Daly after the Crimean War Battle of Balaklava. The township of Balaklava is at the extreme north east corner of the hundred.

The following localities of the Wakefield council area are situated inside (or largely inside) the bounds of the Hundred of Balaklava:
 Balaklava (western quadrant south of Wakefield River only)
 Saints
 Erith
 Kallora (eastern half)
 Avon
 Pinery (western half)
 Long Plains (northern half)

Local government
The District Council of Balaklava was established circa 1870, bringing local government to the hundred. In 1983 the Balaklava council amalgamated with the neighbouring District Council of Port Wakefield and District Council of Owen to bring the hundred under the governance of the new District Council of Wakefield Plains. In 1997 Wakefield Plains and the District Council of Blyth-Snowtown were amalgamated bringing the hundred under the governance of the new Wakefield Regional Council.

See also
Lands administrative divisions of South Australia

References

Balaklava